In 1981 and 1982, prior to publishing dedicated comic books based on Dungeons & Dragons, TSR created a series of comics as advertisements for the Basic and Expert sets. These ads, written by Stephen D. Sullivan; their illustrators included Jeff Dee and Bill Willingham, were divided into two sets. One ran in various Marvel Comics titles; the other in Epic Illustrated and Heavy Metal.

In 1987, following the successful launch of the Dragonlance campaign setting, TSR began a series of graphic novels adapting the setting's successful novels by Margaret Weis and Tracy Hickman. The company's limited familiarity with comic book distribution led them to negotiate a licensing arrangement with DC Comics. DC produced Dungeons & Dragons comics under this license from 1988 until 1991, when conflicts over licensing led DC to not renew the agreement. A number of advertised comics were cancelled as a result, including an intended series written by James Lowder and set in Ravenloft.

Few licensed comics were produced over the next several years, a period of time that included the acquisition of TSR by Wizards of the Coast. In 2001, an agreement was reached with Kenzer and Company to produce Dungeons & Dragons comics, which lasted until 2004 when the property was licensed to Devil's Due Publishing. Devil's Due lost the license in 2008 amidst financial difficulties the company attributed to book store returns.

 the Dungeons & Dragons comic book license has been held by IDW Publications. They have published several new ongoing and limited series along with reprints of earlier series, including some DC and Devil's Due comics. In 2021, HarperCollins Children's Books announced exclusive rights to publish Dungeons & Dragons middle grade books which will include graphic novels.

1980s and 1990s

2000s

2010s

2020s

Notes

References

Dungeons & Dragons
Dungeons & Dragons comics
Works based on Dungeons & Dragons